"Splish Splash" is a 1958 novelty rock song performed and co-written by Bobby Darin. 

It was written with DJ Murray the K (Murray Kaufman), who bet that Darin could not write a song that began with the words, "Splish splash, I was takin' a bath", as suggested by Murray's mother, Jean Kaufman. The song was credited to Darin and "Jean Murray" (a combination of their names) to avoid any hint of payola. 

It was Darin's first hit and the song helped to give him a major boost in his career, reaching No. 3 on the U.S. pop singles chart and No. 2 on the R&B Best Sellers chart.  "Splish Splash" was Darin's only entry on the C&W Best Sellers in Stores chart, where it peaked at No. 14.  In a 1967 interview, Darin claimed that he was so happy about having his first hit that his skin condition cleared up.

Production
Splish Splash was recorded in a session at New York's Atlantic Studios on the evening of April 10, 1958. The personnel on the original recording included Jesse Powell on tenor sax, Al Caiola, Billy Mure on guitar, Wendell Marshall on bass, and Panama Francis on drums.

The lyrics mention several characters from other songs of the period, including "Lollipop", "Peggy Sue", and "Good Golly Miss Molly".

However, in an interview, former classmate Jerrold Atlas claimed that "Miss Molly" referred to Molly Epstein, Darin's former English teacher at the Bronx High School of Science. "She taught him to use the language in staccato notes: short fast, words...She was very fond of Bobby. Bobby told me she sharpened his respect for language".<ref name="Molly Epstein">David Evanier. "Chapter 3: The Nerve of a Burglar" Roman Candle: The Life of Bobby Darin (Holtzbrinck Publishers, 2004) pages 18-19.</ref>

Other versions
British comedian Charlie Drake scored a top ten hit with a comedy version of the song in 1958, produced by future Beatles producer George Martin on the Parlophone label. The song was remade in 1979 by Barbra Streisand for her album Wet. It features new lyrics by Streisand and backing vocals from Toto lead singer Bobby Kimball and Chicago keyboardist Bill Champlin.  A short extract from the song also appears in the video for the 1812 Overture featuring Charlie Drake playing both the conductor and all the musicians.

A Brazilian Portuguese version of the song was recorded in 1963 by Roberto Carlos.

On  1965, Quebecois group César et les Romains broadcast a French cover of the song on television, over the network Télé-Métropole.

In 1976, Barry Williams, Maureen McCormick, Donny Osmond and Marie Osmond performed the song on The Brady Bunch Variety Hour.

Sky diver Andre Tayir performs this song on the Kidsongs Kids’ 1990 video: Ride the Roller Coaster.

In 1990, Joanie Bartels covered the song, releasing it as the only single from the album Bathtime Magic. It also appears on the compilation album The Stars of Discovery Music and in the 1994 video The Rainy Day Adventure.

Kevin Spacey performs the song in the Bobby Darin biopic Beyond the Sea (2004).

In both the English and German versions of Animals United (2010), Billy the Meerkat sings this song while taking a shower, but it's cut off by Toto the Chimpanzee.

In popular culture
"Splish Splash" was featured in the trailer for the Patrick Dempsey film Loverboy. It also appears in the soundtrack for the 1998 movie You've Got Mail.

The song appeared in an episode of Happy Days, in which Richie Cunningham becomes a DJ, 'Richie the C' (possibly a play on Murray the K).

In the Family Ties episode "The Boys Next Door", Elyse performs the song with her childhood friend Roger at a class reunion.

It was featured in a DTV music video on The Disney Channel, set mostly to clips of Disney characters bathing, particularly from the 1948 cartoon Mickey and the Seal (illustrating the singer's bath in the first verse), as well as Mickey's Birthday Party (to illustrate the party Darin walks in on).

The song was also featured on an insert on Sesame Street, where the zookeepers at the Bronx Zoo are washing the elephants.

The song can also be heard in the films Because of Winn-Dixie and Air Bud. It was partially sung in 2012 film The Dictator'', when the main character, General Aladeen (Sacha Baron Cohen) plays a practical joke on his new friend (Jason Mantzoukas) by singing the song with a severed head as a hand puppet, while his friend is taking a shower.

References

External links
 Official Bobby Darin Website, Bobby Darin: Splish Splash
 Splish Splash page from the song's publisher Carlin America

1958 singles
Bobby Darin songs
Songs written by Bobby Darin
1958 songs
Atco Records singles